Hyllisia indica is a species of beetle in the family Cerambycidae. It was described by Breuning in 1947.

References

indica
Beetles described in 1947
Taxa named by Stephan von Breuning (entomologist)